The Battle of the Bay of Biscay of 1592 was a naval engagement that took place in waters of the Bay of Biscay, in November 1592, between a Spanish naval force of 5 flyboats commanded by Captain Don Pedro de Zubiaur and an English convoy of 40 ships, supported by a 6-warship squadron, as part of the Brittany Campaign during the Anglo-Spanish War (1585–1604) and the French Wars of Religion. The Spanish force led by Captain Zubiaur, despite being outnumbered, engaged the English ships, achieving a resounding success. The English flagship was boarded and burned, causing great confusion among the English convoy. Shortly after, another English force composed of six warships (sent by Queen Elizabeth I of England to Bordeaux to support the French Protestants), arrived at the battle, and tried to defend the convoy. After long and intense fighting, the Spaniards were victorious in battle, and three more English ships were captured, besides several ships seriously damaged.

The next year, on 18 April, in the same waters, another English naval force, commanded by Admiral Wilkenson, was defeated by Zubiaur's naval forces off the coasts of Blaye, a town besieged by land and sea by Protestant forces in the context of the French Wars of Religion.

See also
 Bay of Biscay
 Battle of Blaye
 Battle of Cornwall
 French Wars of Religion

Notes

References
 Arsenal, León./Prado, Fernando. Rincones De Historia Española. Editorial EDAF S.L. Madrid 2008.  
 Fernández Duro, Cesáreo (1898). Armada Española desde la unión de los reinos de Castilla y Aragón. Vol. III. Madrid. 
 Extractos de las juntas celebradas por la Real Sociedad Bascongada de los amigos del país, en la villa de Bilbao por julio de 1790. Vitoria. 1790. 
 MacCaffrey, Wallace T. (1994). Elizabeth I: War and Politics, 1588-1603. Princeton. Princeton University Press. USA. 
 Gracia Rivas, Manuel. En el IV Centenario del fallecimiento de Pedro Zubiaur, un marino vasco del siglo XVI. Itsas Memoria. Untzi Museo Naval. San Sebastián 2006.

External links
 Biografía de Don Pedro de Zubiaur 

Bay of Biscay 1592
the Bay of Biscay 1592
the Bay of Biscay 1592
the Bay of Biscay 1592
1592 in Europe
the Bay of Biscay 1592
1592 in the British Empire
1592 in Spain
16th-century military history of Spain